Pococera militella, the sycamore webworm, is a species of pyralid moth in the family Pyralidae.

The MONA or Hodges number for Pococera militella is 5604.

References

Further reading

External links

 

Epipaschiinae
Moths described in 1848